Yewell Melvin Hodges (June 30, 1895 – April 8, 1973) was an American attorney and politician who served as a member of the Virginia Senate.

References

External links
 
 

1895 births
1973 deaths
Democratic Party members of the Virginia House of Delegates
Democratic Party Virginia state senators
20th-century American politicians